Poland competed at the 1984 Summer Paralympics in Stoke Mandeville, Great Britain and New York City, United States. 34 competitors from Poland won 106 medals including 46 gold, 39 silver and 21 bronze, finishing 9th in the medal table.

See also 
 Poland at the Paralympics
 Poland at the 1984 Summer Olympics

References 

Poland at the Paralympics
1984 in Polish sport
Nations at the 1984 Summer Paralympics